The Constitution House of Tabriz, also known as Khaneh Mashrouteh, is a historical edifice located next to the Great Bazaar of Tabriz, on Motahari Ave in Tabriz, Iran. During the years which led to Constitutional Revolution and afterwards the house was used as a gathering place of the leaders, activists and sympathizers of the movement. Among them, the most famous people were Sattar khan, Bagher Khan, Seqat-ol-Eslam Tabrizi and Haji Mirza Aqa Farshi and the founder Haji Mehdi Kuzeh kanaani, himself a revolutionary activist and a well-reputed person of the time; who was named Abolmele, i.e. the father of the nation at the time. The two-story building was constructed in 1868 by Haj Vali Me'mar-e TabriziTABRIZ. It has numerous rooms and halls. The most beautiful part of the house is a skylight and corridor decorated with colorful glass and mirrors. The house was later purchased by Haj Abolghasem Haeri and was the family’s residence until it was turned into a museum.

History
The house was constructed by order of Haj Mehdi Koozekonani in 1868. It includes a two-floor building with internal and external areas featuring Qajar period architecture. Haj Mehdi Koozekonani was a merchant in the Bazaar of Tabriz. With initiating of Constitution revolution and rising up in Tabriz city, Haj Mehdi joined the revolution and became one of the major financier of the revolution. At the same time he used the house as a place for meeting of the revolution heads, and a place for publication of underground paper of the constitution movement. The house became important in the history once again just after World War II, when it was used a place for Azerbaijan's Democrat Party meeting center (1946–1947). In 1975 the house is registered by Cultural Heritage of Iran.

Museum contents
The first floor is an exhibition of sculptures of famous Iranian constitution revolutionaries and some of their personal belongings, including their weapons, underground published newspaper of the revolution, night letters, the printing machine which was used in the house to publish revolution papers, and numerous photos from the revolution. One of the rooms in the building belongs to the woman's role in the revolution.

Location
The Constitutional House of Tabriz is located in Rasteh Koocheh Street in front of Jamee Mosque of Tabriz.

Photo gallery

See also
 Iranian Constitutional Revolution
 Tabriz

References

External links 

 Hāleh Heydari, Khāneh-ye Mashrouteh (The Constitutional Revolution House), in Persian, Jadid Online, 15 January 2010.• Audio slideshow: Untitled Document (4 min 39 sec).
 Tishineh

Museums in Tabriz
Houses in Iran
Buildings of the Qajar period
Houses completed in 1868